Bauger FC is a professional football team based in Santo Domingo, Dominican Republic. Founded in 1986 by Jorge Rolando Bauger as Escuela Bauger, the team changed its name to Bauger FC in 2010. Currently playing in the Liga Dominicana de Fútbol.

History
Bauger FC is a professional soccer team based in Santo Domingo, Dominican Republic. Founded in 1989 as a Football School Jorge Rolando Bauger, the team changed its name to Bauger FC in 2010. The club currently participates in the Dominican Football League.

Founded in 1989 as School of Soccer Jorge Rolando Bauger by the Argentine Jorge Rolando Bauger. Bauger FC It is the pioneer institution of sports institutions specialized in the teaching and promotion of football in the Dominican Republic. The Bauger School has been offering its services to the sports community of the Dominican Republic for more than two decades, during which time its representative teams have successfully participated in many local, national, regional and international competitions. In the School have formed players and technicians that have integrated different selections, both of the Association of soccer of the National District and national.

Sponsors
 Tricom
 Ritter Sport
 Zona Franca San Isidro

Current squad

Notable players
  Jorge Luis Clavelo (2016–)
  Darly Batista (2012–13)
  Jonathan Faña (2015)
  Gonzalo Frechilla (2009)
  César García (2015)
  Ernesto Jiménez (2009)
  Bony Pierre (2015–)

External links
Balompiedominicano
Federacion Dominicana De Futbol 
Prensa Futbol Dominicano
Fifa.com

Football clubs in the Dominican Republic
1989 establishments in the Dominican Republic